Thomas Mashaba (born Khutsong, Gauteng, South Africa) is a professional boxer in the featherweight division holding the lightly regarded IBO title.

His KO over Eric Aiken was voted South Africa's KO of the year 2007 (according to Fightnews).  He lost an upset decision to Cristobal Cruz in March 2008, a major setback in his hopes for a title shot.

External links
Thomas Mashaba profile and pictures
 

Year of birth missing (living people)
Living people
People from Merafong City Local Municipality
Featherweight boxers
South African male boxers
Sportspeople from Gauteng